The 2008 Gatorade Duels were a pair of NASCAR Sprint Cup Series stock car races that were held on February 14, 2008 at Daytona International Speedway in Daytona Beach, Florida, United States. Both, contested over 60 laps, were the qualifying races for the 2008 Daytona 500.  The first race was won by Dale Earnhardt Jr. for the Hendrick Motorsports racing team. Reed Sorenson finished second, and Ryan Newman clinched third. Afterward, the second race was won by Denny Hamlin. Tony Stewart followed in the second position, ahead of third placed Jeff Gordon.

The races set the field for the 50th running of "The Great American Race".  These races are the only ones in the NASCAR Sprint Cup that qualifies drivers and their teams for a points-paying race.  As qualifying only sets the front row for the Daytona 500, these races are formatted as follows:

 The pole sitter for the Daytona 500 (Jimmie Johnson) was on the point for the first race, with odd-numbered racers who have times in the first event, with the third-fastest driver sitting next to the pole sitter on the front row, then fifth- and seventh-fastest drivers in the second row, and so on.
 The second-fastest overall driver (Michael Waltrip) was the pole sitter for race two, with the fourth-fastest driver alongside in the front row, then the sixth- and eighth-fastest cars in row two, and so forth.

Positions three through 39 were filled that way (not counting the pole drivers in each race) along with the top drivers in each race not locked in from the previous season's Top 35, automatically qualify for the race.  After that, the three fastest cars that did not qualify in the races along with a past champions provisional (if needed) completes the 43-car field. Had all past champions made the race, the next fastest car would have been entered into the field.

Top Ten Finishers

Race 1 and 2

(NOTE: Race 2 extended to 64 laps due to green-white-checker finish.)Also Making Daytona 500: 83-Brian Vickers (Toyota)Drivers in boldface qualified for Daytona 500.''

Gatorade Duels
Gatorade Duels
NASCAR races at Daytona International Speedway